Alex Kjeld Pedersen (born 15 November 1966 in Ikast) is a Danish former cyclist.

Major results

1983
 1st  Junior team time trial, World Road Championships (with Kim Olsen, Søren Lilholt and Rolf Sørensen)
 1st Overall Giro della Lunigiana
1984
 3rd Junior road race, World Road Championships
1985
 1st  National team time trial championships (with Bjarne Riis, Per Pedersen and Björn Sørensen)
 3rd Amateur National Road Race Championships
1986
 1st  Amateur National Road Race Championships
1987
 1st Stage 8 Grand Prix Guillaume Tell
 3rd Amateur road race, World Road Championships
1990
 1st Stage 5 Ringerike GP
 3rd National Time Trial Championships
 7th Overall Vuelta a Andalucía
 10th Overall Paris–Nice
1992
 1st  Amateur National Road Race Championships
1993
 1st Grand Prix François-Faber
 2nd Amateur National Road Race Championships
 3rd National Time Trial Championships
1994
 1st  Amateur road race, World Road Championships
 1st Gran Premio della Liberazione
 3rd Overall Toer Report
1st Stage 7

Grand Tour general classification results timeline

References

1966 births
Living people
Danish male cyclists
People from Ikast-Brande Municipality
Sportspeople from the Central Denmark Region